Elfazepam is a drug which is a benzodiazepine derivative. Presumably it has sedative and anxiolytic actions like those of other benzodiazepines.

Orexigenic properties in animals. The mechanism for increasing feed intake is not clear and has been subject of investigation. It has been found that elfazepam suppresses gastric acid secretion.

Synthesis

Benzophenone derivative 1 is reacted with a glycine equivalent masked as an oxazolidine-2,5-dione 2 to give the final product 3 Elfazepam.

References 

Benzodiazepines
Chloroarenes
GABAA receptor positive allosteric modulators
Lactams
Fluoroarenes